Disintegrin and metalloproteinase domain-containing protein 22 also known as ADAM22 is an enzyme that in humans is encoded by the ADAM22 gene.

Function 

ADAM22 is a member of the ADAM (A Disintegrin And Metalloprotease domain) family. Members of this family are membrane-anchored proteins structurally related to snake venom disintegrins, and have been implicated in a variety of biological processes involving cell-cell and cell-matrix interactions, including fertilization, muscle development, and neurogenesis. This gene is highly expressed in the brain and may function as an integrin ligand in the brain. Alternative splicing results in several transcript variants.

Interactions 

ADAM22 has been shown to interact with DLG4.

References

Further reading

External links 
 The MEROPS online database for peptidases and their inhibitors: M12.978
 

Proteases
Human proteins
EC 3.4.24